Alma Butterfield was an Australian writer and actor. She was best known for her work on radio including a long stint on Blue Hills.

According to one critic her performance in Slaughter of St Teresa's Day was "sublime: she brilliantly encapsulates an entire generation of Australian womanhood, with her hunched shoulders, faded dress, mangled vocabulary and verbal sniping."

Select credits
The Slaughter of St Teresa's Day (1960)
A Little South of Heaven (1961)

References

External links
Alma Butterfield at IMDb

Date of birth missing
Date of death missing
20th-century Australian actresses